Flagg Coal Company 75 is a 0-4-0 saddletank steam locomotive built for the Flagg Coal Company in 1930. Restored and owned by John and Byron Gramling, the engine was loaned in 2002 to the Steam Railroading Institute in Owosso, Michigan where it is used for demonstrations and for powering train rides and excursions. Originally numbered Flagg Coal Company 2, the locomotive's number was changed to 75 when it was sold to the Solvay Process Quarry in 1935. It never actually wore "Flagg Coal Company 75" during its service life.

History
FCC No. 75 went into service in December 1930 as No. 2 for the Flagg Coal Company of Avoca, Pennsylvania, where it was used as a switch engine. In 1935 it was sold to the Solvay Process Co. in Jamesville, New York, and renumbered No. 75. It was then used to push 4-wheel hopper cars from the steam shovel to the crusher at the rock quarry. In the early 1950s the Solvay Process Co. replaced the 0-4-0s like No. 75 with trucks and dieselized the handling of finished crushed stone with two GE 80 tonners, No. 5 and No. 6. (#6 now belongs to the Central NY Chapter, NRHS along with former Solvay Process Co. Alco 0-4-0 # 53). In 1954, No. 75 and twelve other locomotives were sold to Dr. Groman and his planned Rail City Museum in Sandy Pond, New York. The locomotive sat there untouched until 1991 when John and Barney Gramling purchased it with the intent to restore it to operating condition. The father-son duo painstakingly disassembled the locomotive, moved it to their shop in Ashley, Indiana and over the course of the following ten years returned it to service. In 2002 John and Barney loaned the locomotive to the Steam Railroading Institute where it was used for demonstrations and to power steam excursions.

Demonstrations
Flagg Coal Company 75 has traveled around the country to operate, give demonstrations and educate the public about steam locomotive operation and history. The locomotive has made a few historic appearances, such as being the first steam locomotive to operate in Port Huron, Michigan, since the early 1960s.

References 

 
 
 

Individual locomotives of the United States
0-4-0ST locomotives
Vulcan Iron Works locomotives
Preserved steam locomotives of Michigan
Standard gauge locomotives of the United States
Railway locomotives introduced in 1930